This is a list of German far-right periodicals (post-1945). In post-World War II Germany, after the defeat of the Nazis and Nazi Germany, the far-right was outlawed by the Allied occupation forces, preventing political continuity of the Nazi Party in a new, post-war form. In West Germany, reformed far-right parties were able to reestablish a foot hold in the national parliament in the early years of the new Federal Republic, courtesy in part to the post-war issues the new country faced. With the recovery of the German economy, the Wirtschaftswunder, the far-right declined in appeal. The far-right, from the 1960s, was characterised by fragmentation and infighting. Following the German reunification, in the early 1990s, the far-right has regained strength and become more of a threat to the democratic Germany again.

In East Germany, a communist country, the far-right was declared extinct by the government despite the fact that a quarter of all members of the ruling communist party, in 1954, had formerly been members of the Nazi Party. Despite the official line, racism and far-right ideology existed and, towards the end of the country's existence in the late 1980s, increased. It was however swept under the carpet by the ruling authorities as ordinary violence and hooliganism rather than being allowed to be seen as a resurface of far-right ideology.

The German Federal Office for the Protection of the Constitution classifies the far-right as a movement against the equality of all people as guaranteed by the German constitution, and as enemies of the democratic nature of the German state. Their aim is to establish an authoritarian state, modelled on the Führerprinzip. The far-right places undue value on race and ethnicity which results in xenophobia and racism. Antisemitism is a core principal of their ideology. Far-right publications generally glorify Germany's Nazi past and the armed forces of the era, the Wehrmacht and Waffen-SS, offering historically revisionist publications and attempting to promote the myth of the "Clean Wehrmacht" and "Clean Waffen-SS". Far-right publisher are however careful to not out-rightly deny or trivialise the Holocaust, this being a criminal offence in Germany, as many have been prosecuted for such offences in the past.

The German Federal Office for the Protection of the Constitution, as of 2017, classifies three political parties as far-right, the National Democratic Party of Germany (NPD), Die Rechte and Der III. Weg, with a combined membership of 6,050.

Historically, a small number of long-standing far-right newspapers and magazines have been published since the early 1950s, like the National Zeitung and Nation Europa, while a larger number of publications have only existed for a short duration. The pulp magazine Der Landser, which existed for almost 60 years, glorified the German armed forces and omit the war crimes committed by Wehrmacht and Waffen-SS, without providing any historical context and was eventually terminated after a complaint by the Simon Wiesenthal Center.

The number of far-right publishers in Germany independent of political parties has declined from 45 in 2001 to 30 in 2016.

Newspapers & magazines
Major far-right newspapers and magazines:

References

Historical revisionism
Far-right politics in Germany